Louis Rudolph Franz Schlegelberger  (23 October 187614 December 1970) was State Secretary in the German Reich Ministry of Justice (RMJ) who served as Justice Minister during the Third Reich. He was the highest-ranking defendant at the Judges' Trial in Nuremberg.

Early life 
Schlegelberger was born into a Protestant salesman's family in Königsberg. He graduated from the University of Königsberg – or according to documents from his trial the University of Leipzig – in 1899 attaining the degree of Doctor of Law. In 1901 Schlegelberger passed the state law examination and became a court Assessor at the Königsberg local court. In 1904 he became a judge at the State Court in Lyck (now Ełk). In early May 1908, he went to the Berlin State Court and in the same year was appointed assistant judge at the Berlin Court of Appeals (Kammergericht). In 1914 he was appointed to the Kammergericht Council (Kammergerichtsrat) in Berlin, where he stayed until 1918.

On 1 April 1918 Schlegelberger became an associate at the Reich Justice Office. On 1 October of that year, he was appointed to the Secret Government Court and Executive Council. In 1927, he was appointed as Ministerial Director in the RMJ. Schlegelberger had been teaching in the Faculty of Law at the University of Berlin as an honorary professor since 1922. On 10 October 1931 Schlegelberger was appointed State Secretary in the Reich Ministry of Justice under Justice Minister Franz Gürtner and kept this job until Gürtner's death in 1941. He was also made a member of the Academy for German Law and was the chairman of its Committee for Water Rights. On 30 January 1938 Schlegelberger joined the Nazi Party on Adolf Hitler's orders.

In the Nazi Party 

Among Schlegelberger's many works in this time was a bill for the introduction of a new national currency which was supposed to end the hyperinflation to which the Reichsmark was prone. After Franz Gürtner's death in 1941, Schlegelberger became provisional Reich Minister of Justice for the years 1941 and 1942, followed then by Otto Thierack. During his time in office the number of death sentences rose sharply. He authored the bills such as the so-called Poland Penal Law Provision (Polenstrafrechtsverordnung) under which Poles were executed for tearing down German posters. Schlegelberger's attitude towards his job may be best encapsulated in a letter to Reich Minister and Chief of the Reich Chancellery Hans Lammers:

However, in a letter to Lammers dated 5 April 1942, Schlegelberger suggested some half-Jews be "spared" and given the choice between "evacuation" or sterilization:

Upon his retirement from the position on 20 August 1942, Hitler gave Schlegelberger an endowment of RM 100,000; in 1944, Hitler allowed him to buy an estate with the money, something that only agricultural experts were entitled to under the rules in force at the time. This would later weigh against him at Nuremberg, for it showed that Hitler thought highly of Schlegelberger.

After the war 
At the Nuremberg Judges' Trial Schlegelberger was one of the main accused. He was sentenced to life in prison for conspiracy to perpetrate war crimes and crimes against humanity.

In the reasons given for the judgment, it says:

At the end of the 1945–1947 trials Schlegelberger was sentenced to life in 1947, although in 1950 the 74-year-old Schlegelberger was released owing to incapacity. For years afterward, he drew a monthly pension of DM 2,894 (for comparison, the average monthly income in Germany at that time was DM 535). Schlegelberger then lived in Flensburg until his death on 14 December 1970.

Bibliography 
 Das Landarbeiterrecht. Darstellung des privaten und öffentlichen Rechts der Landarbeiter in Preußen, Berlin., C. Heymann 1907.
 Kriegsbuch. Die Kriegsgesetze mit der amtlichen Begründung und der gesamten Rechtsprechung und Rechtslehre -Berlin, Vahlen 1918 (with Georg Güthe)
 Freiwillige Gerichtsbarkeit, Heft 43, Berlin 1935 Industrieverlag Spaeth & Linde
 Gesetz über die Aufwertung von Hypotheken und anderen Ansprüchen vom 16. Juli 1925, Berlin, Dahlen, 1925. (co-author: Rudolf Harmening)
 Zur Rationalisierung der Gesetzgebung., Berlin, Vlg. Franz Vahlen, 1928
 Jahrbuch des Deutschen Rechtes., with Leo Sternberg, 26th volume, report about the year 1927, Vahlen, Berlin, 1928
 Das Recht der Neuzeit. Ein Führer durch das geltende Recht des Reichs und Preußens seit 1914 with Werner Hoche, Berlin: Franz Vahlen 1932.
 Rechtsvergleichendes Handwörterbuch für das Zivil- und Handelsrecht des In- und Auslandes – 4. Bd.: Gütergemeinschaft auf Todesfall – Kindschaftsrecht, Berlin Franz Vahlen, 1933
 Die Zinssenkung nach der Verordnung des Reichspräsidenten vom 8. Dezember 1931, with an introduction and brief comments by Dr. Dr. F. Schlegelberger, State Secretary in the Reich Justice Ministry, Franz von Dahlen, Berlin 1932
 Das Recht der Neuzeit. Vom Weltkrieg zum nationalsozialistischen Staat. Ein Führer durch das geltende Recht des Reichs und Preußens von 1914 bis 1934., Berlin: Franz Vahlen 1934.
 Die Erneuerung des deutschen Aktienrechts, Vortrag gehalten am 15. August 1935 vor der Industrie- und Handelskammer in Hamburg, Verlag Franz Vahlen, 1935
 Gesetz über die Angelegenheiten der freiwilligen Gerichtsbarkeit, Köln, Heymanns 1952.
 Das Recht der Gegenwart. Ein Führer durch das in Deutschland geltende Recht as publisher, Berlin and Frankfurt a. M., Franz Vahlen Verlag 1955
 Das Recht der Gegenwart : ein Führer durch das in der Bundesrepublik Deutschland geltende Recht – 29. Aufl., Stand: 1 January 1998. – München : Vahlen, 1998 
 Seehandelsrecht. Zugleich Ergänzungsband zu Schlegelberger, Kommentar zum Handelsgesetzbuch, Berlin, Vahlen, 1959.(with Rudolf Liesecke)
 Kommentar zum Handelsgesetzbuch in der seit dem 1. Oktober 1937 geltenden Fassung (ohne Seerecht). Annotated by Ernst Geßler, Wolfgang Hefermehl, Wolfgang Hildebrandt, Georg Schröder, Berlin, Vahlen, 1960; 1965; 1966.

References

Further reading 
 Michael Förster, Jurist im Dienst des Unrechts: Leben und Werk des ehemaligen Staatssekretärs im Reichsjustizministerium, Franz Schlegelberger, 1876–1970, Baden-Baden 1995
 Eli Nathans, Franz Schlegelberger, Baden-Baden 1990
 Arne Wulff, Staatssekretär Professor Dr. Dr. h.c. Franz Schlegelberger, 1876–1970, Frankfurt am Main 1991

External links 
 
 Legal Order as Motive and Mask: Franz Schlegelberger and the Nazi Administration of Justice
 Schlegelberger's testimony before the Nuremberg Tribunal
 Excerpts from the Judges' Trial
 

1876 births
1970 deaths
Judges in the Nazi Party
German people convicted of crimes against humanity
German people of Austrian descent
German prisoners sentenced to life imprisonment
Holocaust perpetrators in Poland
Jurists from Königsberg
Members of the Academy for German Law
Nazi Germany ministers
Nazis convicted of war crimes
Nazi Party politicians
People convicted by the United States Nuremberg Military Tribunals
People from the Province of Prussia
Prisoners sentenced to life imprisonment by the United States military